German submarine U-720 was a Type VIIC U-boat of Nazi Germany's Kriegsmarine during World War II. The submarine was laid down on 17 August 1942 at the H. C. Stülcken Sohn yard at Hamburg, launched on 5 June 1943, and commissioned on 17 September 1943 under the command of Leutnant zur See Wolf-Harald Schüer.

Design
German Type VIIC submarines were preceded by the shorter Type VIIB submarines. U-720 had a displacement of  when at the surface and  while submerged. She had two shafts and two  propellers.

U-720 was fitted with five  torpedo tubes (four fitted at the bow and one at the stern), fourteen torpedoes, one  SK C/35 naval gun, 220 rounds, and two twin  C/30 anti-aircraft guns. The boat had a complement of between forty-four and sixty.

Service history

References

Bibliography

External links

World War II submarines of Germany
German Type VIIC submarines
1943 ships
Ships built in Hamburg
U-boats commissioned in 1943
U-boats sunk in 1945
Operation Deadlight
U-boats sunk by British warships
World War II shipwrecks in the Atlantic Ocean
Maritime incidents in December 1945